The Never Never Newsreel was a weekly syndicated satirical radio sketch created by Australian satirist Josh Zepps that ran until June 2008. It was aired on Radio 2UE in Sydney and on syndicated stations across Australia.

The Newsreel was the successor to Mike Carlton's long-running weekly comedy sketch Friday News Review, which Zepps also performed in. Zepps' other weekly political sketch, Kevin Rudd's Diary, is the successor to John Howard's Diary and Kim Beazley's Diary.

References

External links
 Sydney Morning Herald article

Australian radio comedy
2000s Australian radio programs